

Events

Pre-1600
1098 – Fighters of the First Crusade defeat Kerbogha of Mosul at the battle of Antioch.
1360 – Muhammed VI becomes the tenth Nasrid king of Granada after killing his brother-in-law Ismail II.

1461 – Edward, Earl of March, is crowned King Edward IV of England.
1495 – A French force heavily defeats a much larger Neapolitan and Spanish army at the battle of Seminara, leading to the creation of the Tercios by Gonzalo de Córdoba.
1519 – Charles V is elected Emperor of the Holy Roman Empire.
1575 – Sengoku period of Japan: The combined forces of Oda Nobunaga and Tokugawa Ieyasu are victorious in the Battle of Nagashino.

1601–1900
1635 – Guadeloupe becomes a French colony.
1651 – The Battle of Berestechko between Poland and Ukraine starts.
1745 – A New England colonial army captures the French fortifications at Louisbourg (New Style).
1776 – American Revolutionary War: The Battle of Sullivan's Island ends with the American victory, leading to the commemoration of Carolina Day.
  1776   – American Revolutionary War: Thomas Hickey, Continental Army private and bodyguard to General George Washington, is hanged for mutiny and sedition.
1778 – American Revolutionary War: The American Continentals engage the British in the Battle of Monmouth Courthouse resulting in standstill and British withdrawal under cover of darkness.
1797 – French troops disembark in Corfu, beginning the French rule in the Ionian Islands.
1807 – Second British invasion of the Río de la Plata; John Whitelocke lands at Ensenada on an attempt to recapture Buenos Aires and is defeated by the locals.
1838 – Coronation of Queen Victoria of the United Kingdom.
1841 – The Paris Opera Ballet premieres Giselle in the Salle Le Peletier.
1855 – Sigma Chi fraternity is founded in North America.
1859 – The first conformation dog show is held in Newcastle upon Tyne, England.
1865 – The Army of the Potomac is disbanded.
1870 – The US Congress establishes the first federal holidays (New Year Day, July 4th, Thanksgiving, and Christmas). 
1880 – Australian bushranger Ned Kelly is captured at Glenrowan.
1881 – The Austro–Serbian Alliance of 1881 is secretly signed.
1882 – The Anglo-French Convention of 1882 marks the territorial boundaries between Guinea and Sierra Leone.
1894 – Labor Day becomes an official US holiday.
1895 – The United States Court of Private Land Claims rules James Reavis’s claim to Barony of Arizona is "wholly fictitious and fraudulent."
1896 – An explosion in the Newton Coal Company's Twin Shaft Mine in Pittston, Pennsylvania results in a massive cave-in that kills 58 miners.

1901–present
1902 – The U.S. Congress passes the Spooner Act, authorizing President Theodore Roosevelt to acquire rights from Colombia for the Panama Canal.
More than 635 people die during the sinking.
1911 – The Nakhla meteorite,  the first one to suggest signs of aqueous processes on Mars, falls to Earth, landing in Egypt.
1914 – Archduke Franz Ferdinand of Austria and his wife Sophie are assassinated in Sarajevo; this is the casus belli of World War I.
1917 – World War I: Greece joins the Allied powers.
1919 – The Treaty of Versailles is signed, ending the state of war between Germany and the Allies of World War I.
1921 – Serbian King Alexander I proclaims the new constitution of the Kingdom of Serbs, Croats and Slovenes, known thereafter as the Vidovdan Constitution.
1922 – The Irish Civil War begins with the shelling of the Four Courts in Dublin by Free State forces.
1926 – Mercedes-Benz is formed by Gottlieb Daimler and Karl Benz merging their two companies.
1936 – The Japanese puppet state of Mengjiang is formed in northern China.
1940 – Romania cedes Bessarabia and Northern Bukovina to the Soviet Union after facing an ultimatum.
1942 – World War II: Nazi Germany starts its strategic summer offensive against the Soviet Union, codenamed Case Blue.
1945 – Poland's Soviet-allied Provisional Government of National Unity is formed over a month after V-E Day.
1948 – Cold War: The Tito–Stalin Split results in the expulsion of the League of Communists of Yugoslavia from the Cominform.
  1948   – Boxer Dick Turpin beats Vince Hawkins at Villa Park in Birmingham to become the first black British boxing champion in the modern era.
1950 – Korean War: Suspected communist sympathizers (between 60,000 and 200,000) are executed in the Bodo League massacre.
  1950   – Korean War: Packed with its own refugees fleeing Seoul and leaving their 5th Division stranded, South Korean forces blow up the Hangang Bridge in an attempt to slow North Korea's offensive. The city falls later that day.
  1950   – Korean War: The Korean People's Army kills almost a thousand doctors, nurses, inpatient civilians and wounded soldiers in the Seoul National University Hospital massacre.
1956 – In Poznań, workers from HCP factory go to the streets, sparking one of the first major protests against communist government both in Poland and Europe.
1964 – Malcolm X forms the Organization of Afro-American Unity.
1969 – Stonewall riots begin in New York City, marking the start of the Gay Rights Movement.
1973 – Elections are held for the Northern Ireland Assembly, which will lead to power-sharing between unionists and nationalists in Northern Ireland for the first time.
1976 – The Angolan court sentences US and UK mercenaries to death sentences and prison terms in the Luanda Trial.
1978 – The United States Supreme Court, in Regents of the University of California v. Bakke bars quota systems in college admissions.
1981 – A powerful bomb explodes in Tehran, killing 73 officials of the Islamic Republican Party.
1982 – Aeroflot Flight 8641 crashes in Mazyr, Belarus, killing 132 people.
1987 – For the first time in military history, a civilian population is targeted for chemical attack when Iraqi warplanes bombed the Iranian town of Sardasht.
1989 – On the 600th anniversary of the Battle of Kosovo, Slobodan Milošević delivers the Gazimestan speech at the site of the historic battle.
1997 – Holyfield–Tyson II: Mike Tyson is disqualified in the third round for biting a piece off Evander Holyfield's ear.
2001 – Slobodan Milošević is extradited to the ICTY in The Hague to stand trial.
2004 – Iraq War: Sovereign power is handed to the interim government of Iraq by the Coalition Provisional Authority, ending the U.S.-led rule of that nation.
2009 – Honduran president Manuel Zelaya is ousted by a local military coup following a failed request to hold a referendum to rewrite the Honduran Constitution. This was the start of the 2009 Honduran constitutional crisis.
2016 – A terrorist attack in Turkey's Istanbul Atatürk Airport kills 42 people and injures more than 230 others.

Births

Pre-1600
 751 – Carloman I, king of the Franks (d. 771)
1243 – Emperor Go-Fukakusa of Japan (d. 1304)
1444 – Charlotte, Queen of Cyprus (d. 1487)
1476 – Pope Paul IV (d. 1559)
1490 – Albert of Brandenburg, German archbishop (d. 1545)
1491 – Henry VIII of England (d. 1547)
1503 – Giovanni della Casa, Italian author and poet (d. 1556)
1547 – Cristofano Malvezzi, Italian organist and composer (d. 1599)
1557 – Philip Howard, 20th Earl of Arundel, English nobleman (d. 1595)
1560 – Giovanni Paolo Lascaris, Grand Master of the Knights Hospitaller (d. 1657)
1573 – Henry Danvers, 1st Earl of Danby, English noble (d. 1644)
1577 – Peter Paul Rubens, Flemish painter and diplomat (d. 1640)
1582 – William Fiennes, 1st Viscount Saye and Sele, English politician (d. 1662)

1601–1900
1604 – Heinrich Albert, German composer and poet (d. 1651)
1641 – Marie Casimire Louise de La Grange d'Arquien, consort to King John III Sobieski (d. 1716)
1653 – Muhammad Azam Shah, Mughal emperor (d. 1707)
1703 – John Wesley, English cleric and theologian (d. 1791)
1712 – Jean-Jacques Rousseau, Swiss philosopher and polymath (d. 1778)
1719 – Étienne François, duc de Choiseul, French general and politician, Prime Minister of France (d. 1785)
1734 – Jean-Jacques Beauvarlet-Charpentier, French organist and composer (d. 1794)
1742 – William Hooper, American physician, lawyer, and politician (d. 1790)
1824 – Paul Broca, French physician, anatomist, and anthropologist (d. 1880)
1825 – Emil Erlenmeyer, German chemist (d. 1909)
1831 – Joseph Joachim, Austrian violinist, composer, and conductor (d. 1907)
1836 – Emmanuel Rhoides, Greek journalist and author (d. 1904)
1844 – John Boyle O'Reilly, Irish-born poet, journalist and fiction writer (d. 1890)
1852 – Charles Cruft, English showman, founded Crufts Dog Show (d. 1938)
1867 – Luigi Pirandello, Italian dramatist, novelist, and poet, Nobel Prize laureate (d. 1936)
1873 – Alexis Carrel, French surgeon and biologist, Nobel Prize laureate (d. 1944)
1875 – Henri Lebesgue, French mathematician and academic (d. 1941)
1879 – Wilhelm Steinkopf, German chemist (d. 1949)
1880 – John Meyers, American swimmer and water polo player (d. 1971)
1883 – Pierre Laval, French soldier and politician, 101st Prime Minister of France (d. 1945)
1884 – Lamina Sankoh, Sierra Leonean banker and politician (d. 1964)
1888 – George Challenor, Barbadian cricketer (d. 1947)
  1888   – Stefi Geyer, Hungarian violinist and educator (d. 1956)
1891 – Esther Forbes, American historian and author (d. 1968)
  1891   – Carl Spaatz, American general (d. 1974)
1892 – Carl Panzram, American serial killer (d. 1930)
1893 – August Zamoyski, Polish-French sculptor (d. 1970)
1894 – Jessie Baetz, Canadian-American artist, composer and pianist (d. 1974 or later)
  1894   – Francis Hunter, American tennis player (d. 1981)

1901–present
1902 – Richard Rodgers, American playwright and composer (d. 1979)
1906 – Maria Goeppert Mayer, German-American physicist and academic, Nobel Prize laureate (d. 1972)
1907 – Jimmy Mundy, American saxophonist and composer (d. 1983)
  1907   – Yvonne Sylvain, First female Haitian physician (d. 1989)
1909 – Eric Ambler, English author and screenwriter (d. 1998)
1912 – Carl Friedrich von Weizsäcker, German physicist and philosopher (d. 2007)
1913 – Franz Antel, Austrian director and producer (d. 2007)
  1913   – George Lloyd, English soldier and composer (d. 1998)
  1913   – Walter Oesau, German colonel and pilot (d. 1944)
1914 – Aribert Heim, Austrian SS physician and Nazi war criminal (d. 1992)
1917 – A. E. Hotchner, American author and playwright (d. 2020)
1918 – William Whitelaw, 1st Viscount Whitelaw, Scottish-English politician, Deputy Prime Minister of the United Kingdom (d. 1999)
1919 – Joseph P. Lordi, American government official (d. 1983)
1920 – Clarissa Eden, Spouse of the Prime Minister of the United Kingdom (d. 2021)
1921 – P. V. Narasimha Rao, Indian lawyer and politician, 9th Prime Minister of India (d. 2004)
1923 – Pete Candoli, American trumpet player (d. 2008)
  1923   – Adolfo Schwelm Cruz, Argentinian racing driver (d. 2012)
  1923   – Gaye Stewart, Canadian ice hockey player (d. 2010)
1924 – Kalevi Keihänen, Finnish entrepreneur (d. 1995)
1926 – George Booth, American cartoonist (d. 2022)
  1926   – Mel Brooks, American actor, director, producer, and screenwriter
  1926   – Robert Ledley, American academic and inventor (d. 2012)
1927 – Correlli Barnett, English historian and author
  1927   – Frank Sherwood Rowland, American chemist and academic, Nobel Prize laureate (d. 2012)
1928 – Hans Blix, Swedish politician and diplomat, 33rd Swedish Minister of Foreign Affairs
  1928   – Patrick Hemingway, American writer
  1928   – Harold Evans, English-American historian and journalist (d. 2020)
  1928   – Peter Heine, South African cricketer (d. 2005)
  1928   – Cyril Smith, English politician (d. 2010)
1929 – Alfred Miodowicz, Polish politician (d.2021)
1930 – William C. Campbell, Irish-American biologist and parasitologist, Nobel Prize laureate
  1930   – Itamar Franco, Brazilian engineer and politician, 33rd President of Brazil (d. 2011)
  1930   – Jack Gold, English director and producer (d. 2015)
1931 – Hans Alfredson, Swedish actor, director, and screenwriter (d. 2017)
  1931   – Junior Johnson, American race car driver (d. 2019)
  1931   – Lucien Victor, Belgian cyclist (d. 1995)
1932 – Pat Morita, American actor (d. 2005)
1933 – Gusty Spence, Northern Irish loyalist and politician (d. 2011)
1934 – Robert Carswell, Baron Carswell, Northern Irish lawyer and judge, Lord Chief Justice of Northern Ireland
  1934   – Roy Gilchrist, Jamaican cricketer (d. 2001)
  1934   – Bette Greene, American journalist and author (d. 2020)
  1934   – Carl Levin, American lawyer and politician (d.2021)
  1934   – Georges Wolinski, Tunisian-French journalist and cartoonist (d. 2015)
1935 – John Inman, English actor (d. 2007)
1936 – Chuck Howley, American football player
1937 – George Knudson, Canadian golfer (d. 1989)
  1937   – Fernand Labrie, Canadian endocrinologist and academic (d. 2019)
  1937   – Ron Luciano, American baseball player and umpire (d. 1995)
1938 – John Byner, American actor and comedian
  1938   – Leon Panetta, American lawyer and politician, 23rd United States Secretary of Defense
  1938   – S. Sivamaharajah, Sri Lankan Tamil newspaper publisher and politician (d. 2006)
  1938   – Simon Douglas-Pennant, 7th Baron Penrhyn, British baron
1939 – Klaus Schmiegel, German chemist
1940 – Karpal Singh, Malaysian lawyer and politician (d. 2014)
  1940   – Muhammad Yunus, Bangladeshi economist and academic, Nobel Prize laureate
1941 – Al Downing, American baseball player and sportscaster
  1941   – Joseph Goguen, American computer scientist and academic, developed the OBJ language (d. 2006)
  1941   – David Johnston, Canadian academic, lawyer, and politician, 28th Governor General of Canada
1942 – Chris Hani, South African politician (d. 1993)
  1942   – Hans-Joachim Walde, German decathlete (d. 2013)
  1942   – Frank Zane, American professional bodybuilder and author
1943 – Jens Birkemose, Danish painter
  1943   – Donald Johanson, American paleontologist and academic
  1943   – Klaus von Klitzing, German physicist and academic, Nobel Prize laureate
1945 – Ken Buchanan, Scottish boxer
  1945   – David Knights, English bass player and producer
  1945   – Raul Seixas, Brazilian singer-songwriter, guitarist, and producer (d. 1989)
  1945   – Türkan Şoray, Turkish actress, director, and screenwriter
1946 – Robert Asprin, American soldier and author (d. 2008)
  1946   – Bruce Davison, American actor and director
  1946   – David Duckham, English rugby player
  1946   – Robert Xavier Rodríguez, American classical composer
  1946   – Jaime Guzmán, Chilean lawyer and politician (d. 1991)
  1946   – Gilda Radner, American actress and comedian (d. 1989)
1947 – Mark Helprin, American novelist and journalist
  1947   – Laura Tyson, American economist and academic
1948 – Kathy Bates, American actress
  1948   – Sergei Bodrov, Russian-American director, producer, and screenwriter
  1948   – Deborah Moggach, English author and screenwriter
  1948   – Daniel Wegner, Canadian-American psychologist and academic (d. 2013)
1949 – Don Baylor, American baseball player and coach (d. 2017)
1950 – Philip Fowke, English pianist and educator
  1950   – Mauricio Rojas, Chilean-Swedish economist and politician
  1950   – Chris Speier, American baseball player and coach
1951 – Mick Cronin, Australian rugby league player and coach
  1951   – Mark Shand, English conservationist and author (d. 2014)
  1951   – Lalla Ward, English actress and author
1952 – Enis Batur, Turkish poet and author
  1952   – Pietro Mennea, Italian sprinter and politician (d. 2013)
  1952   – Jean-Christophe Rufin, French physician and author
1954 – A. A. Gill, Scottish author and critic (d. 2016)
  1954   – Alice Krige, South African actress 
 1955    – Shirley Cheriton, British actress
1956 – Amira Hass, Israeli journalist and author
  1956   – Noel Mugavin, Australian footballer and coach
1957 – Lance Nethery, Canadian ice hockey player and coach
  1957   – Georgi Parvanov, Bulgarian historian and politician, 4th President of Bulgaria
  1957   – Mike Skinner, American race car driver
  1957   – Jim Spanarkel, American basketball player and sportscaster
1958 – Donna Edwards, American lawyer and politician
  1958   – Félix Gray, Tunisian-French singer-songwriter
1959 – Clint Boon, English singer and keyboard player 
  1959   – John Shelley, British illustrator
1960 – John Elway, American football player and manager
  1960   – Roland Melanson, Canadian ice hockey player and coach
1961 – Jeff Malone, American basketball player and coach
1962 – Anișoara Cușmir-Stanciu, Romanian long jumper
  1962   – Artur Hajzer, Polish mountaineer (d. 2013)
  1962   – Ann-Louise Skoglund, Swedish hurdler
1963 – Peter Baynham, Welsh actor, producer, and screenwriter
  1963   – Charlie Clouser, American keyboard player, songwriter, and producer 
1964 – Christina Ashcroft, Canadian sport shooter
  1964   – Mark Grace, American baseball player and sportscaster
  1964   – Bernie McCahill, New Zealand rugby player
  1964   – Dan Stains, Australian rugby league player and coach
  1964   – Steve Williamson, English saxophonist and composer 
1965 – Jessica Hecht, American actress 
  1965   – Tiaan Strauss, South African rugby player
1966 – Peeter Allik, Estonian painter and illustrator (d. 2019)
  1966   – Bobby Bare Jr., American singer-songwriter and guitarist 
  1966   – John Cusack, American actor and screenwriter
  1966   – Mary Stuart Masterson, American actress
1967 – Leona Aglukkaq, Canadian politician, 7th Canadian Minister of Health
  1967   – Gil Bellows, Canadian actor and producer
  1967   – Zhong Huandi, Chinese runner
  1967   – Lars Riedel, German discus thrower
1968 – Chayanne, Puerto Rican-American singer-songwriter and actor 
1969 – Tichina Arnold, American actress and singer
  1969   – Stéphane Chapuisat, Swiss footballer
  1969   – Fabrizio Mori, Italian hurdler
1970 – Mushtaq Ahmed, Pakistani cricketer and coach
  1970   – Tom Merritt, American journalist
  1970   – Mike White, American actor, director, producer, and screenwriter
1971 – Lorenzo Amoruso, Italian footballer
  1971   – Fabien Barthez, French footballer
  1971   – Bobby Hurley, American basketball player and coach
  1971   – Ron Mahay, American baseball player and scout
  1971   – Elon Musk, South African-born American entrepreneur
  1971   – Aileen Quinn, American actress and singer
1972 – Ngô Bảo Châu, Vietnamese-French mathematician and academic
  1972   – Chris Leslie, English politician, Shadow Chancellor of the Exchequer
  1972   – Geeta Tripathee, Nepali poet, lyricist and literary critic
  1972   – Alessandro Nivola, American actor
1973 – Adrián Annus, Hungarian hammer thrower
  1973   – Corey Koskie, Canadian baseball player
1974 – Rob Dyrdek, American skateboarder, entrepreneur, and reality television star
1975 – Jon Nödtveidt, Swedish singer-songwriter, and guitarist (d. 2006)
1976 – Shinobu Asagoe, Japanese tennis player
  1976   – Seth Wescott, American snowboarder
1977 – Chris Spurling, American baseball player
  1977   – Mark Stoermer, American bass player, songwriter, and producer
  1977   – Harun Tekin, Turkish singer and guitarist 
1978 – Simon Larose, Canadian tennis player
1979 – Randy McMichael, American football player
  1979   – Florian Zeller, French author and playwright
1980 – Jevgeni Novikov, Estonian footballer
1981 – Savage, New Zealand rapper 
  1981   – Michael Crafter, Australian singer-songwriter 
  1981   – Guillermo Martínez, Cuban javelin thrower
  1981   – Brandon Phillips, American baseball player
1982 – Ibrahim Camejo, Cuban long jumper
1985 – Phil Bardsley, English footballer
  1985   – Colt Hynes, American baseball player
1986 – Kellie Pickler, American singer-songwriter
1987 – Sonata Tamošaitytė, Lithuanian hurdler
  1987   – Terrence Williams, American basketball player
1989 – Jason Clark, Australian rugby league player
  1989   – Andrew Fifita, Australian rugby league player
  1989   – David Fifita, Australian rugby league player
  1989   – Julia Zlobina, Russian-Azerbaijani figure skater
  1989   – Markiplier, American internet personality
  1989   – Nicole Rottmann, Austrian tennis player
1991 – Seohyun, South Korean singer, dancer, and actress
  1991   – Kevin De Bruyne, Belgian footballer
  1991   – Kang Min-hyuk, South Korean singer, drummer, and actor
1992 – Oscar Hiljemark, Swedish footballer
  1992   – Elaine Thompson, Jamaican sprinter
1993 – Bradley Beal, American basketball player
1994 – Hussein, Crown Prince of Jordan
1996 – Donna Vekić, Croatian tennis player
  1996   – Larissa Werbicki, Canadian rower
1997 – Tadasuke Makino, Japanese racing driver
1999 – Markéta Vondroušová, Czech tennis player
2002 – Marta Kostyuk, Ukrainian tennis player

Deaths

Pre-1600
 202 – Yuan Shao, Chinese warlord
 548 – Theodora I, Byzantine empress
 572 – Alboin, King of the Lombards
 683 – Leo II, pope of the Catholic Church (b. 611)
767 – Paul I, pope of the Catholic Church (b. 700)
 975 – Cyneweard, bishop of Wells
1031 – Taira no Tadatsune, Japanese governor
1061 – Floris I, count of Holland
1175 – Andrey Bogolyubsky, Russian Grand Prince (b. 1111)
1189 – Matilda of England, Duchess of Saxony, (b. 1156)
1194 – Xiao Zong, Chinese emperor (b. 1127)
1385 – Andronikos IV, Byzantine emperor (b. 1348)
1497 – James Tuchet, 7th Baron Audley, English rebel leader (b. c. 1463)
1575 – Yonekura Shigetsugu, Japanese samurai
1586 – Primož Trubar, Slovenian author and reformer (b. 1508)
1598 – Abraham Ortelius, Flemish cartographer and geographer (b. 1527)

1601–1900
1607 – Domenico Fontana, Italian architect (b. 1543)
1716 – George FitzRoy, 1st Duke of Northumberland, English general and politician, Lord Lieutenant of Berkshire (b. 1665)
1757 – Sophia Dorothea of Hanover, queen consort of Frederick William I (b. 1687)
1798 – John Henry Colclough, Irish revolutionary (b. c. 1769)
1813 – Gerhard von Scharnhorst, Prussian general and politician, Prussian Minister of War (b. 1755)
1834 – Joseph Bové, Russian architect, designed the Triumphal Arch of Moscow (b. 1784)
1836 – James Madison, American academic and politician, 4th President of the United States (b. 1751)
1880 – Texas Jack Omohundro, American soldier and hunter (b. 1846)
1881 – Jules Armand Dufaure, French politician, 33rd Prime Minister of France (b. 1798)
1889 – Maria Mitchell, American astronomer and academic (b. 1818)
1892 – Alexandros Rizos Rangavis, Greek poet and politician, Greek Foreign Minister (b. 1810)

1901–present
1913 – Manuel Ferraz de Campos Sales, Brazilian lawyer and politician, 4th President of Brazil (b. 1841)
1914 – Sophie, duchess of Hohenberg (b. 1868)
  1914   – Franz Ferdinand, archduke of Austria (b. 1863)
1915 – Victor Trumper, Australian cricketer (b. 1877)
1917 – Ștefan Luchian, Romanian painter and educator (b. 1868)
1922 – Velimir Khlebnikov, Russian poet and playwright (b. 1885)
1925 – Georgina Febres-Cordero, Venezuelan nun (b. 1861)
1925 – Henry C. Berghoff, German-American politician (b. 1856)
1929 – Edward Carpenter, English poet and philosopher (b. 1844)
1936 – Alexander Berkman, American author and activist (d. 1870)
1939 – Douglas H. Johnston, governor of the Chickasaw Nation (b. 1856) 
1940 – Italo Balbo, Italian air marshal and politician (b. 1896) 
1944 – Friedrich Dollmann, German general (b. 1882)
1945 – Yunus Nadi Abalıoğlu, Turkish journalist (b. 1879) 
1947 – Stanislav Kostka Neumann, Czech writer, poet and journalist (b. 1875)
1960 – Jake Swirbul, American businessman, co-founded the Grumman Aircraft Engineering Corporation (b. 1898)
1962 – Mickey Cochrane, American baseball player and manager (b. 1903)
  1962   – Cy Morgan, American baseball player (b. 1878)
1965 – Red Nichols, American cornet player, bandleader, and composer (b. 1905)
1966 – Mehmet Fuat Köprülü, Turkish historian and politician, 21st Deputy Prime Minister of Turkey (b. 1890)
1971 – Franz Stangl, Austrian SS officer (b. 1908)
1974 – Vannevar Bush, American engineer and academic (b. 1890)
1975 – Constantinos Apostolou Doxiadis, Greek architect (b. 1913)
  1975   – Rod Serling, American screenwriter and producer (b. 1924)
1978 – Clifford Dupont, English-Rhodesian lawyer and politician, 1st President of Rhodesia (b. 1905)
1980 – José Iturbi, Spanish pianist and conductor (b. 1895)
1981 – Terry Fox, Canadian runner and activist (b. 1958)
1983 – Alf Francis, German-English motor racing mechanic and racing car constructor (b. 1918)
1984 – Yigael Yadin, Israeli archaeologist, general, and politician (b. 1917)
1985 – Lynd Ward, American author and illustrator (b. 1905)
1989 – Joris Ivens, Dutch journalist, director, and producer (b. 1898)
1992 – Guy Nève, Belgian racing driver (b. 1955)
  1992   – Mikhail Tal, Latvian chess player (b. 1936)
1995 – Petri Walli, Finnish singer-songwriter, guitarist, and producer (b. 1969)
1999 – Vere Bird, first Prime Minister of Antigua and Barbuda (b. 1910)
2000 – Nils Poppe, Swedish actor, director, and screenwriter (b. 1908)
2001 – Mortimer J. Adler, American philosopher and author (b. 1902)
2003 – Joan Lowery Nixon, American journalist and author (b. 1927)
2004 – Anthony Buckeridge, English author (b. 1912)
2005 – Brenda Howard, American activist (b. 1946)
  2005   – Michael P. Murphy, American lieutenant, Medal of Honor recipient (b. 1976)
2006 – Jim Baen, American publisher, founded Baen Books (b. 1943)
  2006   – Peter Rawlinson, Baron Rawlinson of Ewell, English lawyer and politician, Attorney General for England and Wales (b. 1919)
  2006   – George Unwin, English pilot and commander (b. 1913)
2007 – Eugene B. Fluckey, American admiral, Medal of Honor recipient (b. 1913)
  2007   – Kiichi Miyazawa, Japanese lawyer and politician, 78th Prime Minister of Japan (b. 1919)
2009 – A. K. Lohithadas, Indian director, producer, and screenwriter (b. 1955)
  2009   – Billy Mays, American TV personality (b. 1958)
2010 – Robert Byrd, American lawyer and politician (b. 1917)
2012 – Richard Isay, American psychiatrist and author (b. 1934)
  2012   – Leontine T. Kelly, American bishop (b. 1920)
  2012   – Robert Sabatier, French author and poet (b. 1923)
  2012   – Doris Sams, American baseball player (b. 1927)
2013 – Ted Hood, American sailor and architect (b. 1927)
  2013   – Tamás Katona, Hungarian historian and politician (b. 1932)
  2013   – Kenneth Minogue, New Zealand-Australian political scientist and academic (b. 1930)
  2013   – F. D. Reeve, American author and academic (b. 1928)
  2013   – David Rubitsky, American sergeant (b. 1917)
2014 – Seymour Barab, American cellist and composer (b. 1921)
  2014   – Jim Brosnan, American baseball player (b. 1929)
  2014   – On Kawara, Japanese painter (b. 1933)
  2014   – Meshach Taylor, American actor (b. 1947)
2015 – Jack Carter, American actor and comedian (b. 1922) 
  2015   – Jope Seniloli, Fijian politician, Vice-President of Fiji (b. 1939)
  2015   – Wally Stanowski, Canadian ice hockey player (b. 1919)
2016 – Scotty Moore, American guitarist (b. 1931)
  2016   – Pat Summitt, American women's college basketball head coach (b. 1952)
  2016   – Buddy Ryan, American football coach (b. 1931)
2018 – Harlan Ellison, American writer (b. 1934)

Holidays and observances
Christian feast day:
Basilides and Potamiana
Irenaeus of Lyon (Western Christianity)
Heimerad
Blessed Maria Pia Mastena
Paulus I
Vincenza Gerosa
June 28 (Eastern Orthodox liturgics)
Constitution Day (Ukraine)
Poznań Remembrance Day (Poland)
Vidovdan, celebrating St. Vitus and an important day in Serbian history. (Eastern Orthodox Church)

References

External links

 
 
 
 

Days of the year
June